KCVE-LP (92.3 FM) was a radio station broadcasting a Religious format. Licensed to Ventura, California, United States, the station served the Ventura County area. The station was owned by Calvary Chapel of Ventura. The license was cancelled by the FCC on May 26, 2009.

References

External links
 Query the FCC's FM station database for KCVE-LP

CVE-LP
Defunct radio stations in the United States
Defunct companies based in California
Radio stations disestablished in 2009
Radio stations established in 2005
2005 establishments in California
2009 disestablishments in California
Defunct religious radio stations in the United States
CVE-LP